Child's Play is a 1988 American slasher film directed by Tom Holland, from a screenplay by Holland, Don Mancini and John Lafia, and based on a story by Mancini. It is the first film in the Child's Play series and the first installment to feature the character Chucky. It stars Catherine Hicks and Chris Sarandon with Brad Dourif as Chucky. Its plot follows a widowed mother who gives a doll to her son, unaware that the doll is possessed by the soul of a serial killer.

Child's Play was released in the United States on November 9, 1988, by MGM/UA Communications Co. It grossed more than $44 million against a production budget of $9 million.

Along with the film gaining a cult following, the box office success spawned a media franchise that includes a series of seven sequels (one of them being a television series), merchandise, comic books, a reboot film of the same name released in June 2019. Child's Play was distributed by Metro-Goldwyn-Mayer, although the rights to the series were sold to Universal Pictures in 1990, beginning with the sequel Child's Play 2. MGM retained the rights to the first film and, as such, distributed the 2019 reboot.

Plot 
Detective Mike Norris chases fugitive serial killer Charles Lee Ray through the streets of Chicago and into a toy store. After being shot by Norris, a dying Ray performs a voodoo chant to transfer his soul to one of the Good Guy-brand talking dolls on display. The store is struck by lightning and explodes, and Norris finds Ray's lifeless body in the rubble next to the doll.

Widow Karen Barclay's six-year-old son Andy desperately wants a Good Guy doll for his birthday, but she cannot afford one. Soon after, she learns that a homeless man outside of her workplace has gotten ahold of a Good Guy doll and is trying to sell it. She buys it and gives it to Andy. The doll appears normal and refers to itself as "Chucky". That night, Karen's best friend Maggie watches over Andy while Karen works late. After Andy's bedtime, Maggie finds Chucky sitting in front of a television tuned to a late-night newscast about Ray's death. She is then attacked by Chucky, causing her to fall out of the window to her death. Police search the apartment and Norris considers Andy a suspect, despite Karen's protests. Andy claims that Chucky killed Maggie and says that Chucky told him that his real name was "Charles Lee Ray".

The next morning, Chucky orders Andy to skip school and take a train downtown. While Andy is distracted, Chucky sneaks into the home of his former accomplice, Eddie Caputo, and kills him by causing a gas explosion. Andy is again considered a suspect and is admitted to a psychiatric hospital after claiming Chucky is the culprit. Karen returns home with Chucky and discovers batteries in the doll's box; the doll has been moving and speaking without them. Frightened, Karen lights her fireplace and threatens to burn Chucky, who violently comes alive in her arms and attacks her before escaping. Karen goes to the police and explains what happened; Norris doesn't believe her. Karen finds the man who sold her the doll and asks for more information. Norris arrives and interrogates the man, forcing him to admit that he took the doll from the torched toy store.

Karen unsuccessfully tries to convince Mike that the doll is alive, but he insists that he killed Ray. After bringing Karen home, Norris is attacked by Chucky, and in the ensuing fight, he shoots the doll, whose wound inexplicably bleeds and causes pain. Chucky escapes to his former voodoo instructor John, who informs him that the longer his soul remains in the doll, the more "human" the doll will become. Chucky demands that John help him reverse the spell, but he refuses, stating that Chucky's soul transfer violated everything he taught him about voodoo. Chucky tortures John with a voodoo doll, forcing him to reveal that in order to escape the doll's body, Chucky must transfer his soul to the first human he revealed his true identity to: Andy. Chucky stabs the voodoo doll in the chest, mortally wounding John, and escapes. Karen and Norris arrive shortly after. Before dying, John tells them that to kill Chucky, they must strike at his heart.

Chucky arrives at the psychiatric hospital where Andy is being held and kills a doctor with an electroshock therapy device. In the chaos, Andy escapes and flees home, but Chucky follows closely behind and knocks him out. As Chucky prepares to possess him with the voodoo chant, Karen and Norris arrive. Karen and Andy manage to trap Chucky in the fireplace and light him on fire, but a charred Chucky rises and chases Andy. Karen shoots Chucky repeatedly, blowing him to pieces. Norris' partner Jack arrives at the apartment, initially refusing to believe the three's story about the doll being alive. Chucky's body suddenly bursts through a vent to strangle Jack. Karen manages to tear Chucky off of Jack and Norris shoots Chucky's body through the heart, finally killing him. Jack, Norris, Karen, and Andy then leave the room, with Andy turning back to look at Chucky's remains.

Cast 
 Catherine Hicks as Karen Barclay
 Chris Sarandon as Detective Mike Norris
 Alex Vincent as Andy Barclay
 Dinah Manoff as Maggie Peterson
 Tommy Swerdlow as Jack Santos
 Jack Colvin as Dr. Ardmore
 Raymond Oliver as John "Dr. Death" Bishop
 Neil Giuntoli as Eddie Caputo
 Brad Dourif as Charles Lee Ray/Chucky
 Edan Gross as Friendly Chucky (voice)
 John Franklin as Walkabout Chucky
 Ed Gale as Chucky (in-suit performer)

Additionally, Alan Wilder appears as Walter Criswell, Edan Gross as a young boy in a commercial promoting Good Guy dolls / Oscar Doll, Aaron Osborne as an orderly, Juan Ramirez as the homeless man who Karen received Chucky from, Tyler Hard as Mona, Ted Liss as George, Roslyn Alexander as Lucy

Chucky puppeteers
 Howard Berger
 Bill Bryan
 Allen Coulter
 Steven James
 Frank Charles Lutkus III
 David Arthur Nelson
 Loren Soman
 Marc Tyler
 N. Brock Winkless IV

Production

Development 
According to an interview with Mental Floss, screenwriter Don Mancini first conceived of the concept while studying as a film major at the University of California, Los Angeles. Mancini was inspired by the consumerism of the 1980s and the effect of marketing on children based on his experiences with his father, an advertising executive. Mancini's troubled relationship with his own father and his experiences of alienation as a gay man caused him to center the script around a child with a single mother and no father figure. He was also influenced by the Cabbage Patch Kids, Trilogy of Terror, Magic, Poltergeist, the character of Freddy Krueger from A Nightmare on Elm Street, and The Twilight Zone episode "Living Doll". The film's executive producer David Kirschner, who would produce all seven films in the Chucky series, claimed in the same interview that he had wanted to make a film about a killer doll after reading The Dollhouse Murders. The director Tom Holland has also affirmed that the My Buddy dolls played a role in Chucky's design.

Mancini's original script was titled Batteries Not Included, with the title later changed to Blood Buddy after it was discovered that a different film with the same name was being made. During production it was nearly retitled again in order to avoid confusion with Sidney Lumet's 1972 horror film of the same name. It would have featured a doll filled with fake blood that would allow it to bleed if played with roughly, and it would have come alive after Andy mixed his own blood with the doll's. The doll would have represented Andy's suppressed rage, and would have targeted his enemies. Mancini's original script would have been a whodunit story which dealt with the effect of advertising and television on children. Mancini's original script was also written to toy with the audience a bit longer, making it ambiguous whether Andy or Chucky was the killer.

Charles Band expressed interest in filming the script, and later produced the Puppet Master franchise. The script was accepted by United Artists after studio president Tony Thomopoulous and MGM/UA Communications Chairman Lee Rich realized that it could begin a long-running series. After UA purchased the script it was rewritten by John Lafia to make the character of Andy more sympathetic and after Kirschner expressed doubt that parents would buy their children a doll with fake blood. In Lafia's rewritten script Charles Lee Ray's soul would have been transferred to the doll after being executed by electric chair as it was being manufactured on an assembly line. The script featured the doll factory where Chucky was produced as a location, which would be recycled for the second film.

Lafia wanted to direct the film after being hired for the rewrites but was turned down because he had never directed a feature-length motion picture at the time, and the studio sought an experienced director for the production. William Friedkin, Irvin Kershner, Robert Wise, Joseph Ruben, Howard Franklin, and Rocky Morton and Annabel Jankel were approached to direct before Holland was hired on Steven Spielberg's recommendation from his work on Amazing Stories. John Lithgow was considered to play Charles Lee Ray before Brad Dourif was hired in the role after Holland worked with him in Fatal Beauty. Initially the voice of Chucky's doll form was intended to be a simple electronic overlay similar to ordinary toys with sound chips. When this was deemed infeasible and when Dourif was initially unavailable to record Chucky's voice because of his involvement in Spontaneous Combustion, Holland cast Jessica Walter to voice Chucky on the basis that Mercedes McCambridge had voiced Pazuzu in The Exorcist. Later, Walter's recordings were discarded and she was replaced with John Franklin, who completed his lines was also replaced when Dourif returned to the film. Unlike Walter, part of Franklin's performance remains in the film through a scene in which he appears as a human television presenter dressed as a Good Guy, a scene which was shot after his replacement.

Filming 
Principal photography began on January 7, 1988, and wrapped on March 5, 1988, with a budget of $9–13 million. Mancini never entered the set and was minimally involved in the production because of the 1988 Writers Guild of America strike. Child's Play was filmed on location in Chicago. The Brewster Apartments, a Chicago landmark located at Diversey Parkway and Pine Grove Avenue, served as the location of the apartment where Andy and Karen lived and is pictured on the film's poster. In-studio filming took place at Culver Studios in Culver City, California.

Chucky's full name, Charles Lee Ray, is derived from the names of notorious killers Charles Manson, Lee Harvey Oswald, and James Earl Ray.

Maggie's death was originally going to be by electrocution while taking a bath. The idea was abandoned, and was later used for Tiffany's death in Bride of Chucky.

Visual effects 
The film used various ways to portray Chucky, including radio-controlled animatronics operated by up to nine puppeteers, extras of short stature, and child actors. Kevin Yagher was in charge of the puppetry for the film. Various animatronics and cosmetics were used for every scene. Throughout the film, Chucky transitions from appearing as a normal toy to appearing more human, with his hairline receding throughout the film. The film created multiple Chucky animatronics such as a flailing tantrum Chucky, a walking Chucky, and a stationary Chucky. The animatronic doll's face was controlled via remote control through a rig capturing facial movement on puppeteer Brock Winkless. For some scenes Holland used short-statured actors and children such as Ed Gale and Alex Vincent's sister Ashley with forced perspective sets.

Test screening 
The film initially received negative reviews after a two-hour rough cut was shown to audiences at a test screening. Kirschner and Mancini subsequently cut 25 minutes of the film to reduce the amount of time Chucky was on screen, something Kirschner had advocated for during production to build suspense in a similar fashion to Jaws or Alien. Holland, who had repeatedly clashed with Kirschner over Chucky's amount of time on screen and the film's tone during shooting, objected to the cuts and left the production.

The three have also suggested that the test screening flopped due to their use of Walter as the doll's voice. They claimed that while Walter's voice was suitably menacing, she was unable to convey the humor intended for the character, and all of her lines were redubbed with Dourif's voice. The cut footage, shown only in production stills and the film's script, would have featured Charles Lee Ray stalking a drunk woman as a human only to discover it to be Mike Norris on an undercover sting operation, Andy showing Chucky around his room and finding a photograph of his deceased father, John healing an infant through a Voodoo ritual, and Chucky unsuccessfully trying to break into Andy's room at the mental hospital and tricking a mentally-ill girl named Mona into carrying him into the ward.

The script also featured an alternate ending in which Chucky is stabbed by Andy with a knife mounted on a radio-controlled car and has his face and legs melted with a squirt gun filled with Drano in addition to being lit on fire and shot repeatedly by Mike and Karen. Chucky would have been seemingly killed by being overpowered by Jack and several police officers. While storing Chucky's remains in an evidence room, another cop would have disbelieved Jack's assertion that the doll was alive, and after they left, Chucky's disembodied arm would have come to life to swat a fly.

Music 
The score was composed by Joseph Renzetti which featured a collection of electronic and orchestral elements. Portions of the soundtrack were released on vinyl in 1989 and was later followed up by another vinyl pressing by Waxwork Records that featured the complete score from the original master tapes.

Release 
Child's Play was produced on a budget of $9,000,000. MGM/UA made a controversial decision to not release the film during Halloween, moving the release date closer to Veterans Day weekend. The film was heavily promoted for three weeks before release through television spots emphasizing audience reactions directed towards 12-to-20-year-olds and intended to “position Chucky as the new terror icon.” The film was released on November 9, 1988, in 1,377 theaters, opening at #1, out of the other 12 films that were showing that week, with $6,583,963. The film went on to gross $33,244,684 at the US box office and an additional $10,952,000 overseas for a worldwide total of $44,196,684. It became United Artists' second highest-grossing film of 1988 following Rain Man.

Home media 
Child's Play was originally released on VHS in North America by MGM/UA Home Video on April 25, 1989.

The film was first released on DVD by MGM in 1999. The film was presented in an open-matte full screen presentation and included a theatrical trailer and a "Making Of" booklet. The Australian DVD release by MGM featured the film in non-anamorphic widescreen transfer. The DVD was re-released in 2007 with a lenticular cover.

A 20th Anniversary DVD was released by MGM and 20th Century Fox Home Entertainment on September 9, 2008. The film is presented in its original 1.85:1 Widescreen format (for the first time in the U.S. in 20 years) enhanced for 16x9 monitors and includes an English 5.1 surround track and English, French, and Spanish 2.0 stereo tracks. Special features include two audio commentaries with Alex Vincent, Catherine Hicks, Kevin Yagher, producer David Kirschner and screenwriter Don Mancini, a "Selected Scene Chucky Commentary", "Evil Comes in Small Packages" featurettes, a vintage featurette from 1988 titled "Introducing Chucky: The Making of Child's Play", and "Chucky: Building a Nightmare" featurette, theatrical trailer and a photo gallery. The film received a Blu-ray Disc release on September 15, 2009. The DVD does not feature any contributions from director Tom Holland, who claims he was not asked to contribute to it. In response, the website Icons of Fright contacted Holland and asked if he would be willing to record a commentary track that would be free for download on their website. He agreed, and the track is downloadable from here.

On October 8, 2013, the film was re-released again on DVD and Blu-ray in a boxset for the respective formats, containing all six Child's Play films.

On October 18, 2016, Scream Factory and MGM re-released the film in a brand new Collector's Edition Blu-ray.

On October 3, 2017, Universal Home Entertainment re-released the film once again on DVD and Blu-ray in a boxset for the respective formats, containing all seven Child's Play films.

On August 16, 2022, the film was released in Ultra HD Blu-ray for the first time by Scream Factory, featuring newly-restored scans from the original camera negatives made for the first three Child's Play films in addition to Blu-rays containing new and legacy extras as well as the previously released remastered of the film from the 2016 Collector's Edition Blu-ray.

Reception 

Review aggregator Rotten Tomatoes reports that 71% of 48 surveyed critics gave the film a positive review; the average rating is 6.50/10. The site's critics consensus reads, "Child's Play occasionally stumbles across its tonal tightrope of comedy and horror, but its genuinely creepy monster and some deft direction by Tom Holland makes this chiller stand out on the shelf." On Metacritic, which assigns a normalized rating to reviews, the film has a weighted average score of 58 out of 100 based on 12 critics, indicating "mixed or average reviews". Audiences polled by CinemaScore gave the film an average grade of "B" on an A+ to F scale.

Roger Ebert gave the film 3 out of 4 stars, calling it a "cheerfully energetic horror film." Caryn James of The New York Times praised it as "a clever, playful thriller," adding, "It's the deft wit and swift editing that keeps us off guard, no matter how predictable the plot." Variety called the film a "near-miss", commending Tom Holland's "impressive technical skill" and the actors for keeping "straight faces during these outlandish proceedings," but finding that "the novelty is not buttressed by an interesting story to go along with the gimmick."

Kevin Thomas of the Los Angeles Times wrote, "Scary, yet darkly funny, this thriller of the supernatural from the director of the terrific 'Fright Night' moves with the speed of a bullet train and with style to burn." Dave Kehr of the Chicago Tribune gave the film 1 out of 4 stars and wrote that it "would probably be sickening if it weren't so relentlessly stupid." Richard Harrington of The Washington Post wrote that Holland "keeps things moving without rushing them. Unfortunately, 'Child's Play' gets a little ugly at the end, not only because the finale seems a rehash of virtually every shock movie of the last 10 years, but because it involves the very realistic terrorizing of a 6-year-old."

Philip Strick of The Monthly Film Bulletin found the plot contrived with "ludicrous supernatural gobbledygook" but thought that Holland handled the action sequences well. Author and film critic Leonard Maltin gave the film three out of a possible four stars, calling it "[a] scary and clever horror thriller", also praising the film's special effects.

Awards

Controversy 
During the initial release, a large crowd of protesters formed at the main entrance of MGM calling for a ban on the film because, they claimed, it would incite violence in children. Local news reporters from two TV stations were broadcasting live from the scene. The producer, David Kirschner, was watching the demonstration on TV and was disturbed. Jeffrey Hilton, who had been working in Kirschner's office at MGM, indicated that he could quell the disturbance in ten minutes. While Kirschner was watching from the safety of his office, Hilton spoke to the group's leader and shook his hand. The group instantly dispersed, much to the chagrin of the newscasters. Hilton did not reveal to Kirschner whether it had been a threat or simple diplomacy that saved the day.

Hilton's diplomacy notwithstanding, the film series was plagued with accusations of inciting violence in children. Child's Play 3 was cited as the "inspiration" for two murders, which took place in the United Kingdom in December 1992 and February 1993 respectively: the murder of Suzanne Capper and the murder of James Bulger. In the Suzanne Capper case, the 16-year-old was forced to listen to recordings of the gangleader repeating the catchphrase "I'm Chucky, wanna play?" Tom Holland, in response to both murders, defended the film, stating that viewers of horror movies could only be influenced by their content if they were "unbalanced to begin with."

Sequels 
The film was followed by several sequels including Child's Play 2 (1990), Child's Play 3 (1991), Bride of Chucky (1998), Seed of Chucky (2004), Curse of Chucky (2013), Cult of Chucky (2017), and a television series titled Chucky (2021).

Reboot 

A reboot of the franchise was announced by Metro-Goldwyn-Mayer to be in development beginning in July 2018. Lars Klevberg served as director, from a script by Tyler Burton Smith. The film was co-produced by Seth Grahame-Smith, David Katzenberg and Aaron Schmidt. The adaptation featured a group of kids who come into contact with a modern-day hi-tech version of the Good Guys doll. The film starred Gabriel Bateman as Andy Barclay and Aubrey Plaza as his mother Karen. The film was released on June 21, 2019.

See also 

 List of American films of 1988
 "Living Doll", a 1963 episode of The Twilight Zone about a murderous talking doll
 Dolls, a 1987 horror film about killer dolls
 Trilogy of Terror, a 1975 anthology film featuring a story about a living Zuni fetish doll
 Zapatlela, a 1993 Marathi language unofficial remake of Child's Play directed and written by Mahesh Kothare.

References

External links 

 
 
 
 
 

1988 films
1988 horror films
1988 independent films
1980s supernatural horror films
American independent films
American supernatural horror films
1980s English-language films
Child's Play (franchise) films
Fictional portrayals of the Chicago Police Department
Films about children
Films about murderers
Films about Voodoo
Films directed by Tom Holland
Films produced by David Kirschner
Films scored by Joe Renzetti
Films set in 1988
Films set in apartment buildings
Films set in Chicago
Films set in psychiatric hospitals
Films shot in Chicago
Innovation Publishing titles
Metro-Goldwyn-Mayer films
Obscenity controversies in film
United Artists films
Films about mother–son relationships
American slasher films
Supernatural slasher films
1980s American films
1980s slasher films